Gazivaz (also Romanized as Gazīvaz; also known as Gazīvar) is a village in Baghan Rural District, Mahmeleh District, Khonj County, Fars Province, Iran. At the 2006 census, its population was 121, in 25 families.

References 

Populated places in Khonj County